Burythorpe is a village and civil parish in the Ryedale district of North Yorkshire, England, about  south of Malton. It was historically part of the East Riding of Yorkshire until 1974. According to the 2001 census it had a population of 289, reducing marginally to 286 at the Census 2011. The Whitegrounds barrow is nearby.

Etymology
The name Burythorpe was recorded in the 1096 Domesday Book as Bergetorp and is of Old Norse origin. The first element is Bjorg, a feminine personal name. The second is þorp, meaning "farmstead, hamlet" (c.f. Danish torp, German Dorf).

Buildings

The Church of All Saints is a Grade II listed building. The current building was built in 1858 in the Gothic Revival style replacing a previous church on the site.

The Bay Horse public house which closed in April 2014 was reopened in October 2016 after a local group campaigned to have it recognised as an important asset of the community. The pub is listed in Baines 1823 directory along with a reference to Francis Consitt who is stated to have died in Burythorpe in 1768 at the age of 150.

References

External links

Burythorpe Parish Council website
Burythorpe East Riding: A Vision of Britain

Villages in North Yorkshire
Civil parishes in North Yorkshire